Geoffrey Frederick Buckland (born 10 November 1947), was an Australian Labor Party member of the Australian Senate from 2000 to 2005, representing the state of South Australia. Buckland was selected by the Parliament of South Australia to fill the Senate seat left vacant after the resignation of John Quirke under Section 15 of the Australian Constitution. He was born in Sydney, New South Wales, and was blast furnace operator, and an official with the Federated Ironworkers' Association and later the Whyalla-Woomera Branch Secretary of the Australian Workers' Union before entering politics.

Buckland did not contest the 2004 election. His term expired on 30 June 2005.

References

1947 births
Living people
Australian Labor Party members of the Parliament of Australia
Labor Right politicians
Australian trade unionists
Ironworkers
Members of the Australian Senate for South Australia
Members of the Australian Senate
21st-century Australian politicians
20th-century Australian politicians